Cosmopolitan localism or Cosmolocalism is a social innovation approach to community development that seeks to link local and global communities through resilient infrastructures that bring production and consumption closer together, building on distributed systems. The concept of cosmopolitan localism was pioneered by Wolfgang Sachs, a scholar in the field of environment, development, and globalization. Sachs is known as one of the many followers of Ivan Illich and his work has influenced the green and ecological movements. Contrary to glocalisation, cosmolocalism moves from locality to universality, acknowledging the local as the locus of social co-existence and emphasizing the potential of global networking beyond capitalist market rules.

Cosmopolitan localism fosters a global network of mutually supportive communities (neighbourhoods, villages, towns, cities and regions) who share and exchange knowledge, ideas, skills, technology, culture and (where socially and ecologically sustainable) resources. The approach seeks to foster a creative, reciprocal relationship between the local and the global. Cosmopolitan localism aims to address problems that emerge from globalization—namely, the subsuming of local cultures and economies into a homogenised and unsustainable global system—while simultaneously avoiding the pitfalls of localization, such as parochialism and isolationism.

The self-organization of people with access to the fostered global network, collaborate and produce shared resources and their own governance systems. This system is built around a commons and entails the social practices of creating and governing a resource through the institutions that a community of producers or users creates and manages. They manifest in various formats, from the co-management of natural resources (e.g., fisheries, pastures) to the co-creation and co-management of digitally shared content. Initiatives such as the free encyclopedia Wikipedia, which has displaced the corporate-organized Encyclopedia Britannica and Microsoft Encarta, and the Apache HTTP Server, the leading software in the web-server market, have exemplified digital commons. The beginning of commons almost exclusively contained digital forms of virtual projects and communities. The later movements of commons have now also included local manufacturing and the entanglement between analog and digital technologies across natural and digital commons, physical and digital spaces, activities, and time.     

Italian design and social innovation educator and academic Ezio Manzini describes cosmopolitan localism as having the potential to generate a new sense of place. With cosmopolitan localism, places are not considered isolated entities, but nodes in short-distance and long-distance networks which globally link local communities in distributed networks of shared exchange, bringing production and consumption closer together. The short-distance networks generate and regenerate the local socio-economic fabric and the long-distance networks connect a particular community to the rest of the world. This form of cosmolocalism is rooted in an emerging productive model that is based on the concept of the digital commons and the motto "design global, manufacture local" (DGML). 
 
Cosmopolitan localism is a topic of focus for transition designers who explore design-led societal transition toward more sustainable futures. Others have argued that cosmolocalism advances alternatives that could potentially undermine dominant capitalist imaginary significations, attitudes and modalities. It can lead the way for a transition towards a post-capitalist, commons-centric economy and society where value is collectively created and accessible to all. In order for cosmolocalism to become more than a blueprint for a mode of production, the autonomy of local communities and individuals is essential.

See also
 Commons-based peer production
 Distributed manufacturing
 Open manufacturing
 Open-design movement
 Open-source architecture
 Hackerspace
 Fab Lab

References

External links
 Manzini, E. (2013) Small, Local, Open and Connected: Resilient Systems and Sustainable Qualities in Design Observer
 Schismenos, A., Niaros, V. & Lemos, L. (2020) Cosmolocalism: Understanding the Transitional Dynamics Towards Post-Capitalismin Triple-C. 18 (2): 670–684.

Sustainability
Innovation
Sustainable development
Community development
Community building